Boo! is a British children's television series that was broadcast in the United Kingdom on the CBeebies channel, and originally on BBC Two. It features several cartoon characters who play a game similar to hide and seek in a variety of settings. The commentary is performed by an adult male and female narrators and a chorus of children. It was produced by the independent production company Tell-Tale Productions, which was also responsible for Tweenies. From 2007 to 2012, reruns of the show were broadcast in the USA on Qubo.

The series aired for a total of 104 episodes and one Christmas special was nominated for the British Academy Children's Award for Pre-School Animation in 2003.

At the end of the programme, a song is sung, usually about matching characters or objects to their shapes or colours.

The visual style of Boo! is very distinctive, using 3D CGI with rounded shapes and cel-shading. The music and songs are generally in an early-70s funk/R&B idiom.

Characters
 Boo - a pear/eggplant-shaped patchwork creature with orange spiky hair. His feet are red with white spots on them. The main goal of the programme is to find Boo in his various hiding places. Half-way through each episode, Boo magically adopts attributes of his surroundings (e.g. becomes "Penguin Boo" in the Antarctic or "Pumpkin Boo" on Halloween). Boo cannot talk, although he whistles at the beginning of each episode and dances during every song.
 Laughing Duck (voiced by Kate Harbour) - a yellow duck, who laughs when "found". She has a red-orange bill that matches her legs and has abilities to fly and swim. In some episodes, she meets some people who happen to be employees. In the hospital, she has been found sad because her laugh is lost, but it is regained when Boo tickles her flipper and made her laugh again before we sing the Odd One Out song.
 Sleeping Bear (voiced by Justin Fletcher) a brown bear who is usually asleep, yawning or stretching when "found". His blanket is red with white-printed hearts on it. The catchphrase associated with him is "Shhh... Tippy-toe, tippy-toe." In some episodes, he finds a spot to sleep around anything that is so cozy. In the police station, he was lost in the park until his friends had found him sleeping and sitting on the swing set before we sing the Snap song.
 Growling Tiger (voiced by Justin Fletcher) - a friendly tiger with fluffy white ears. Despite his name, he says "Roar!" (not "Growl!") when "found". His associated catchphrase is "It's Growling Tiger! Run away! Run away!"
 
Other characters, both human and animal vary from one episode to another. The people who have speaking roles in this show are the artists, Chatty Hairdresser, Helpful Nurse, Caring Doctor, Helpful Teacher (the ice-skater), Helpful Waitress, Happy Customers (one man and one woman), Busy Chef, the woman in high stilts, the ringmaster, Careful Grownup, Smiling Santa, Graceful Teacher (the ballet dancer), Friendly Police Officers, Strong Lumberjack, Gentle Vet, Smiley Pumpkin lantern and Cheering Dad. The Blue Squawking Parakeet (actually a Cockatoo) with a red crest on it appears in a birdcage (being taken home by a customer) when we are about to enter the veterinarian.

Episodes

Series 1 (2003-2004)
Specials: Pilot - 3 June 2003 this is the first time the children say hello to Boo for the first ever time!
A child says is it chase? Boo shakes his head and another child says is it tag? Then Boo says boo!
 1. Rockpool (Show Us A Shape) - 4 June 2003
 2. Supermarket (The Counting Song) - 11 June 2003
 3. Pond (Show Us A Shape) - 18 June 2003
 4. Art Gallery (We're Looking for a Colour) - 25 June 2003
 5. Desert (Show Us A Shape) - 2 July 2003
 6. Harbour (The Counting Song) - 9 July 2003
 7. Bedroom (Show Us A Shape) - 16 July 2003
 8. Prehistoric Land (We're Looking for a Colour) - 23 July 2003
 9. Theatre (Do the Same as Me) - 30 July 2003
 10. African River (Show Us A Shape) - 6 August 2003
 11. Cave (Do the Same as Me) - 13 August 2003
 12. Coral Reef (Show Us A Shape) - 20 August 2003
 13. Train Station (The Counting Song) - 27 August 2003
 14. Canadian River (Odd One Out) - 4 September 2003
 15. Indian Jungle (Do the Same as Me) - 11 September 2003
 16. Café (The Counting Song) - 18 September 2003
 17. Deep Blue Sea (Show Us A Shape) - 25 September 2003
 18. Castle (The Counting Song) - 1 October 2003
 19. African Waterhole (Show Us A Shape) - 7 October 2003
 20. Kitchen (The Counting Song) - 14 October 2003
 21. Arctic (The Counting Song) - 21 October 2003
 22. Fun Fair (Do the Same as Me) - 28 October 2003
 23. Space (Odd One Out) - 4 November 2003
 24. Garden (Show Us A Shape) - 11 November 2003
 25. Hospital (Odd One Out) - 18 November 2003
 26. Woods at Night (Show Us A Shape) - 25 November 2003
 27. Library - 5 February 2004
 28. Canadian Mountain - 12 February 2004
 29. Australian Bush - 19 February 2004
 30. Swimming Pool - 26 February 2004
 31. Forest Floor - 22 April 2004
 32. Circus - 12 March 2004
 33. Swamp - 19 March 2004
 34. Fun House - 26 March 2004
 35. Playgroup - 2 April 2004
 36. Antarctic - 9 April 2004
 37. Ski Resort - 16 April 2004
 38. Jungle - 25 April 2004
 39. Farm - 30 April 2004
 40. Bathroom - 13 May 2004
 41. Park - 20 May 2004
 42. Zoo - 27 May 2004
 43. English Riverbank - 4 June 2004
 44. American Ranch - 11 June 2004
 45. Bamboo Forest - 18 June 2004
 46. American Prairie - 25 June 2004
 47. Junior Gym - 2 July 2004
 48. Meadow - 9 July 2004
 49. Tropical Island - 16 July 2004
 50. City at Night - 23 July 2004
 51. Pirate Ship - 30 July 2004
 52. City Farm - 6 August 2004

Christmas Special (2004)
 Log Cabin/Santa's House - 2004 (Double-Length Episode)

Series 2 (2005-2006)
 53. Fire Station - 1 March 2005
 54. Dentist - 7 March 2005
 55. The Pyramids - 14 March 2005
 56. Athletics Track - 21 March 2005
 57. Airfield - 28 March 2005
 58. Kite Festival - 4 April 2005
 59. Ballet Class - 11 April 2005
 60. Veterinarian - 18 April 2005
 61. Car Factory - 25 April 2005
 62. Pottery - 2 May 2005
 63. Carpenter's Workshop - 9 May 2005
 64. Sports Day - 16 May 2005
 65. Cheese Market - 23 May 2005
 66. Tennis Court - 30 May 2005
 67. Post Office - 6 June 2005
 68. Diwali Party - 16 September 2005
 69. Fishing Dock - 20 June 2005
 70. Fancy Dress Shop - 27 June 2005
 71. Garden Centre - 4 July 2005
 72. Police Station - 11 July 2005
 73. Pop Concert - 18 July 2005
 74. Chinese Garden - 1 February 2006
 75. Tea Plantation - 3 August 2005
 76. Basketball Court - 10 August 2005
 77. Hairdressers - 17 August 2005
 78. Ice Rink - 24 August 2005
 79. Bus Station - 16 February 2006
 80. Chicken Farm - 23 February 2006
 81. Street Market - 2 March 2006
 82. Bakery - 9 March 2006
 83. Building Site - 16 March 2006
 84. Baseball Ground - 23 March 2006
 85. Birthday Party - 30 March 2006
 86. Football Match - 6 April 2006
 87. Surfer Beach - 13 April 2006
 88. Race Track - 20 April 2006
 89. Roman Villa - 27 April 2006
 90. Orange Grove - 4 May 2006
 91. Venetian Canal - 23 May 2006
 92. Children's Play - 30 May 2006
 93. Crazy Golf Course - 6 June 2006
 94. Timber Forest - 13 June 2006
 95. Lei Day - 20 June 2006
 96. House That's Being Decorated - 24 June 2006
 97. Seaside - 27 June 2006
 98. Halloween - 30 October 2006 
 99. Campsite - 10 July 2006
 100. Film Set - 7 September 2006
 101. Snowy Garden - 8 December 2006
 102. Rainforest Canopy - 23 December 2006
 103. Galapagos Islands - 25 December 2006
 104. Chinese New Year - 29 December 2006

Development, Songs and Broadcast

Development
The show was created by Will Brenton and Iain Lauchlan, who have created and produced Fun Song Factory, BB3B, and Jim Jam and Sunny in addition to Tweenies. Brenton also designed the characters.

On July 26, 2002, the BBC picked up the UK broadcasting rights to Boo! for a broadcast in September 2003. On September 1, it was announced that Universal Pictures had acquired worldwide distribution rights to the series in exchange for providing co-funding.

On May 22, 2003, the show was announced to premiere on June 4 on the CBeebies on BBC Two block.

On April 7, 2004, Boo! was renewed for a second series.

Broadcast
"Boo!" can be seen in the United Kingdom on CBeebies (formerly on CBeebies on BBC Two), reruns from 2007-2012 in the United States on the digital channel Qubo (with two episodes in a half-hour format), Discovery Kids in Latin America, and Australia's ABC. "Boo!" is also available in Canada on the French educational public broadcaster TFO. HOP! in Israel, and Baraem in Qatar.

In some episodes, Growling Tiger, Sleeping Bear or Laughing Duck says when it’s time for a song to begin when Boo dances to every song and the kids begin to yell "Hurray!" really loud before the song begins in every episode of Boo!

Songs
"Where’s Boo? (Can You Find Boo?)"
"Show Us a Shape"
"The Counting Song"
"We’re Looking for a Colour"
"Do the Same As Me"
"Odd One Out"
"Everybody Do This Sound"
"Snap!"
"Can You Guess?"
"What’s Missing?"
and
"Twinkle, Twinkle, Little Star"

Home Media
VHS, DVD and VCD releases of the series were handled by Universal Pictures Video in all regions.

References

External links
 
 
 Variety story from MIPCOM 2002: BBC goes 'Boo!'

2003 British television series debuts
2006 British television series endings
2000s British children's television series
2000s preschool education television series
Animated preschool education television series
BBC children's television shows
British children's animated fantasy television series
British preschool education television series
CBeebies
English-language television shows
Cel-shaded animation
Television series by Universal Television